The 1976 Air India/BP Tennis Classic, also known as the South Pacific Championships was an Association of Tennis Professionals men's tournament held on outdoor grass courts at the Milton Courts in Brisbane, Queensland, Australia that was part of the One Star category of the 1976 Grand Prix tennis circuit. It was the third edition of the tournament and was held from 11 October until 17 October 1976. The tournament moved to Brisbane from the Royal South Yarra Tennis Club in Melbourne where the previous editions had been held. Mark Edmondson won the singles title.

Finals

Singles
 Mark Edmondson defeated  Phil Dent 3–6, 6–4, 6–4, 6–4
 It was Edmondson's 2nd singles title of the year and of his career.

Doubles
 Syd Ball /  Kim Warwick defeated  Brian Fairlie /  Ismail El Shafei 6–4, 6–4

References

External links
 ITF tournament details

Air India/BP Tennis Classic
Air India/BP Tennis Classic, 1976
Air India/BP Tennis Classic
Air India/BP Tennis Classic
Sports competitions in Brisbane
Tennis in Queensland